Moon Sung-Hyun, born in 1952 (Gyeongsangnam-do province) was a graduate of Seoul National University with a major in Business Administration.

He started work as a press and lathe operator in 1979 and by 1985 he headed the trade union of Tong-Il Heavy Machinery. He became Secretary General of the Korean Trade Union Congress in 1993, and from 1999 held the position of President of the Korean Metalworkers Federation. 

He was a founding member of the Democratic Labor Party, and a member of the central committee. He has been the head of the Gyeongsangnam-do province office of the DLP since 2004, and became party president in 2006.

References

Seoul National University alumni
Living people
South Korean politicians
1952 births
People from South Gyeongsang Province